Carl Rasch may refer to:
 Carl L. Rasch, U.S. federal judge
 Carl Rasch (physician)